Francisco Fernandes also known as Francis Fernandes (born 25 November 1985 in Vasco da Gama, Goa) is an Indian professional footballer playing primarily as a winger for the Indian club Dempo S.C. in the Goa Professional League.

Career
Fernandes has spent his childhood in Bogmalo, near to the tourist hotspot of Bogmalo Beach. It was there that he learnt his first lessons in football. He played for his school, Regina Mundi, and later, while at MES college, he gave trials for Vasco and got selected for Vasco U-19. After two successful seasons with the Vasco S.C. senior team, he joined Salgaocar in 2006.

International career
Fernandes scored his first international goal in a 3–2 loss to Palestine on 6 October 2014.

International statistics

International goals
India score listed first, score column indicates score after each Fernandes goal.

Honours

India
 SAFF Championship runner-up: 2013
 Nehru Cup: 2012

Chennaiyin FC
 Indian Super League: 2017–18

References

External links
 
 
 Profile at Goal.com
 

1985 births
Living people
Indian footballers
I-League players
Vasco SC players
Salgaocar FC players
Dempo SC players
Indian Super League players
Odisha FC players
FC Pune City players
India international footballers
India youth international footballers
Footballers from Goa
Footballers at the 2014 Asian Games
Association football wingers
People from Vasco da Gama, Goa
Asian Games competitors for India